William Gilson Farlow (December 17, 1844 – June 3, 1919) was an American botanist, born in Boston, Massachusetts, and educated at Harvard (A.B., 1866; M.D., 1870), where, after several years of European study, he became adjunct professor of botany in 1874 and professor of cryptogamic botany in 1879.

Farlow corresponded with Caroline Bingham and Jacob Georg Agardh collaborating in the identification and classification of species of algae previously unknown to science.

In 1899 he was president of the American Society of Naturalists; in 1904 president of the National Academy of Sciences; in 1905 president of the American Association for the Advancement of Science; and in 1911 president of the Botanical Society of America.

He received honorary degrees from Harvard University, the University of Glasgow (LL.D in 1901), and the University of Wisconsin–Madison.

He was known as the "father" of cryptogamic botany in the United States. Among his students was the phytologist William Albert Setchell.

Among his publications are:  
 The  Gymnosporangia or Cedar-Apples of the United States (1880)  
 Marine Algœ of New England (1881)  
 A Provisional Host-Index of the Fungi of the United States (1888)  
 Biographical Index of North American Fungi (1905)

References

External links
National Academy of Sciences Biographical Memoir

1844 births
1919 deaths
Harvard University faculty
American botanists
American science writers
Harvard University alumni
Writers from Boston
Members of the United States National Academy of Sciences
Harvard Medical School alumni